Rustam Abdullah Sani (12 August 1944 – 23 April 2008) was a Malaysian politician, sociologist and political scientist. He was of Minangkabau descent from Salido, West Sumatera.

Born towards the end of the Japanese occupation of Malaya in the Perak border town of Tanjung Malim, Rustam grew up in the shadow of his famous father, Abdullah Sani, who was better known as Ahmad Boestaman. Boestaman was a Malay nationalist and the founder of political parties Angkatan Pemuda Insaf and Parti Rakyat. He married a woman named Rohani Rustam, who later gets Alzheimer's, and have a son and a daughter, Azrani Rustam and Ariani Rustam.

Rustam served as an associate professor at Universiti Kebangsaan Malaysia, Universiti Malaya and was a prolific writer in Malay and English. His anthology of poems, Riak-Riak Kecil, composed in 1977, was published by Dewan Bahasa dan Pustaka. Rustam won the National Literature Award for 1988/89.

Education

Rustam attended the Victoria Institution in Kuala Lumpur. He later enrolled at the University of Malaya for a bachelor's degree before heading to the University of Kent for a master's degree, where he wrote a thesis entitled Social Roots of the Malay Left which traced the origin of the Malay political left to the 1920s.  At Kent, he mentored a variety of undergraduates including PAS secretary-general Kamaruddin Jaffar, economist Ghazali Atan and publisher Lim Siang Jin.

Early career

Rustam joined the Universiti Kebangsaan Malaysia economics faculty in early 1977, then still at its temporary campus in Lembah Pantai, Kuala Lumpur. It was here he befriended with many personalities such as Jomo Kwame Sundaram, Sanusi Osman, Ting Chew Peh and Shamsul Amri. He deepened his preoccupation with the challenges of Malaysian nationhood at the university, an enduring theme in his writings since the 1970s, and the subject of one of his two latest books, which was launched posthumously by his old friend from the 1960s, Anwar Ibrahim.

Later he embarked for Yale University, but after passing the tough comprehensive exams there, he lost interest, preferring instead to write a statistics textbook. Back at UKM, he switched to the Politics Department as his old Canterbury friend, then Abim secretary-general Kamaruddin, had left to join Anwar in the United Malays National Organisation (UMNO) and the Government.

With Syed Husin at the helm of the Malaysian Social Science Association (PSSM), Rustam started a bilingual quarterly journal, Ilmu Masyarakat, to try to open new Malaysian debates under the dispensation of the then new Prime Minister Datuk Seri Dr Mahathir Mohamad, to which the former UKM academic as well as PNB and Guthrie chief executive Tan Sri Khalid Ibrahim (later Selangor Mentri Besar) was an early and insightful contributor.

At the end of the 1980s, Rustam accepted Nordin Sopiee’s invitation to join ISIS. There, he helped to craft Mahathir’s historic February 1991 speech promising a “Bangsa Malaysia” as part of his Vision 2020 (thankfully translated by Rustam as Wawasan 2020, instead of the earlier Visi 2020), changing the terms of national discourse in one fell swoop.

Frustrated by its lack of serious commitment, he left ISIS in the mid-1990s to become a writer, translator and reluctant businessman.

Soon after, he agreed to become deputy president of PSSM, later inaugurating the biennial series of international Malaysian Studies Conferences in which we tried to reposition Malaysian studies as a national – and nationalist – discourse, rather than as post-colonial studies.

Political involvement
However, the events of 1997-99 with the sacking of the then Deputy Prime Minister Anwar Ibrahim disrupted Rustam's plans and he rose to the popular national call for Reformasi following Anwar’s incarceration and persecution, becoming its most thoughtful “participant observer”.

As deputy president of the Parti Rakyat Malaysia, a party his father had founded almost half a century before, he negotiated its principled unification with the political movement which had emerged around Anwar despite several high-profile defections. After the merger with Parti Keadilan Nasional to become the Parti Keadilan Rakyat (PKR), he became PKR information chief.

Death
Rustam died at his home in Gombak, Selangor on 23 April 2008 at the age of 64 due to respiratory difficulties. His body was sent to a mosque near his house at Bukit Lela and he was later buried at the Taman Danau Kota Muslim cemetery after Zohor prayers.

References 

 Farewell to a true Malaysian, The Star, 26 April 2008.

Notes 

1944 births
2008 deaths
Malaysian bloggers
Malaysian people of Malay descent
Malaysian people of Minangkabau descent
Malaysian Muslims
Malaysian political scientists
Political writers
Malaysian sociologists
Yale University alumni
Alumni of the University of Kent
Academic staff of the National University of Malaysia
Parti Rakyat Malaysia politicians
People's Justice Party (Malaysia) politicians
20th-century political scientists